Dexterville is an unincorporated community in Butler County, Kentucky, United States.

Notes

Unincorporated communities in Butler County, Kentucky
Unincorporated communities in Kentucky